Travesio is a comune (municipality) in the Province of Pordenone in the Italian region Friuli-Venezia Giulia, located about  northwest of Trieste and about  northeast of Pordenone.

Travesio borders the following municipalities: Castelnovo del Friuli, Meduno, Pinzano al Tagliamento, Sequals, Tramonti di Sotto.

Demographic evolution

References

External links
 www.comune.travesio.pn.it/

Cities and towns in Friuli-Venezia Giulia